The Years Pass is a 1945 German drama film directed by Günther Rittau and starring Heidemarie Hatheyer, Carl Kuhlmann and Werner Fuetterer. It was shot at the Althoff Studios in Berlin and on location around Garmisch-Partenkirchen in Bavaria. The film's sets were designed by the art directors Willy Schiller and Karl Vollbrecht.

Cast

References

Bibliography 
 Bock, Hans-Michael & Bergfelder, Tim. The Concise CineGraph. Encyclopedia of German Cinema. Berghahn Books, 2009.

External links 
 

1945 films
1945 drama films
German drama films
Films of Nazi Germany
1940s German-language films
Films directed by Günther Rittau
Tobis Film films
German black-and-white films
1940s German films
Films shot in Bavaria
Films shot at Althoff Studios